The Ninja Tribunal arc was the fifth season of the 2003 Teenage Mutant Ninja Turtles animated series. 

It was originally intended to be the final season of the series, as its arc concluded the main series storyline.. To try to renew interest in the series, "Fast Forward" became the fifth season to air on commercial TV, while Mirage and its partners decided to finish production on the "Ninja Tribunal" episodes and release them directly to DVD. 4Kids Entertainment later signed a deal with Comcast and this season began airing on Comcast-On-Demand in August 2006, though only five episodes would air.

The "Ninja Tribunal" episodes were scheduled to be released on DVD sometime in early 2007, but 4Kids Entertainment later removed them from their release schedule. The episodes would eventually be broadcast on 4Kids TV, starting on February 16, 2008, where it was promoted in commercials as "The Lost Episodes". The DVD set was released on May 20, 2008.

The "Nightmares Recycled" episode was never completed. The script was finished and some animation had begun when 4Kids pulled the plug because it was deemed too controversial and violent for a children's program (Hun and the Garbageman were conjoined twins that were surgically separated at birth by a back-alley surgeon with the Garbageman being discarded as 'garbage'). Since there was no chance of it airing, it was shelved in the early stages of production.

Story
Following on from the previous season's cliffhanger ending, the Turtles and the 4 acolytes – Joi, Feragi, Tora, and Adam – are brought to the Ninja Tribunal's monastery to begin training to combat an unknown evil. Splinter and the Ancient One arrive at the monastery, the former aggressively opposing the Turtles' affiliation with the Tribunal, because of their disinterest in aiding Hamato Yoshi against the Utrom Shredder that could have saved his life. The Tribunal proves to be aggressive and unrelenting in their training, brutally berating their acolytes for even aiding their wounded. The Tribunal finally reveals that the enemy they are preparing to face is in fact a Tengu demon that was the original incarnation of the Shredder, whose legend the Utrom Shredder manipulated to gain respect. The Tengu Shredder will be revived if his helmet and gauntlet are brought together with him, having been separated by the Tribunal millennia ago. Though the Turtles and acolytes retrieve all 3 relics, the Foot Mystics, revealed to be heralds of the Tengu Shredder, attack the temple, stealing the relics and seemingly killing the Tribunal and the Acolytes. The Turtles, Splinter and the Ancient One return to New York to prepare for the coming threat.

The Foot Mystics soon successfully revive the Tengu Shredder, who rampages through New York to kill Karai, who he deems an insult to his name due to her taking on the mantle in the last season. The Turtles manage to achieve a victory, repelling the Tengu Shredder and saving Karai from his wrath. However, the Tengu Shredder soon succeeds in transforming the island of New York into a infernal, Tengu-infested dominion of his; a fate which he intends to inflict upon the rest of the world. To combat this threat to Earth, the Turtles unite with the 4 acolytes (who are revealed to have miraculously survived the monastery's destruction), Hun and the Purple Dragons, the Foot Clan, Agent Bishop and the Earth Protection Force, the Justice Force, and several other allies of theirs to assault the Tengu Shredder's stronghold. After falling in battle, the Turtles are revived by Hamato Yoshi's spirit, and they manage to separate the Tengu Shredder from his helmet and gauntlet, rendering him vulnerable for Yoshi's spirit to finally end the demon's existence. The Ninja Tribunal reveal their survival as well (whist the Foot Mystics could overpower them, the Tribunal lost on purpose to teach their students a lesson), & recruit the Ancient One to serve on their tribunal, Splinter finally makes peace with the loss of his sensei after realizing he and his sons would not exist had the Tribunal assisted Yoshi. Karai parts with the Turtles on friendly terms, seemingly entering a relationship with Dr. Chaplin, and the Turtles and acolytes leave to celebrate their victory.

Cast
 Michael Sinterniklaas as Leo: the leader of the Turtles. He becomes very discouraged when his brothers unlock their powers but not him.
 Wayne Grayson as Mikey: the Turtles' youngest member and a source of comic relief. He is the second turtle to unlock his glowing medallion when he passed the Stealth Test.
 Sam Riegel as Don: the Turtles' genius engineer who is identified as the member who holds the team together as well as the first Turtle to unlock his glowing medallion.
 Greg Abbey as Raph: Leo's second-in-command who can be stubborn but caring. He is the third turtle to unlock his glowing medallion when he was the first one to touch the fire dragon after Juto was talking disrespectfully about Master Splinter and him and his brothers. He and Joi may have feelings for each other.
 Darren Dunstan as Splinter: the Turtles' sensei and adopted father, who suffers from visions of the future where the turtles are murdered by the Tengu Shredder.
 David Chen as The Ancient One: an old ninjutsu master who taught Hamato Yoshi and was taught by the Ninja Tribunal. He is initially reluctant about the Ninja Tribunal taking the turtles and their new apprentices but later accepts it. After the Tribunal's destruction, he helps the turtles defeat the Tengu Shredder.

Supporting
 Hisomi-Shisho: a member of the Ninja Tribunal and master of stealth. He never speaks in the show.
 David Zen Mansley as Kon Shisho: a member of the Ninja Tribunal and master of spirit.
 Marc Thompson as
 Juto Shisho: a member of the Ninja Tribunal and master of weapons.
 Casey: an ally of the Turtles who enters a relationship with April.
 Lenore Zann as Chikara Shisho: a member of the Ninja Tribunal and master of strength.
 David Moo as Faraji Nagala: one of the acolytes who is training under the Ninja Tribunal alongside the Turtles who bonds with leo.
 Britton Herring as Adam McKay: one of the acolytes who is training under the Ninja Tribunal alongside the Turtles who bonds with Donnie.
 Rebecca Soler as Joei Reynard: one of the acolytes who is training under the Ninja Tribunal alongside the Turtles. She and Raph may have feelings for each other.
 David Chen as Tora Yoshida: one of the acolytes who is training under the Ninja Tribunal alongside the Turtles and bonds with Mikey.
 Veronica Taylor as April: an ally of the Turtles who enters a relationship with Casey.
 Karen Neill as Karai: the Utrom Shredder's adopted daughter whom after his defeat vows to avenge him and takes the mantle of the Shredder and the leadership of the Foot Clan. But after being nearly murdered by the Tengu Shredder, is convinced to put her difference with the turtles aside and join forces with them.
 Terrance Archie as Silver Sentry: the leader of the Justice Force and a friend of Michelangelo. He along with his fellow superheroes join forces with the turtles and their allies against the Tengu Shredder.

Villains
 Scottie Ray as Oroku Saki / the Tengu Shredder: the main antagonist of the series and the original incarnation of the Shredder. Initially a demon Tengu, his spirit took over the body of Oroku Saki, a former member of the Ninja Tribunal who defeated him but excepted the demon's offer for power in exchange of letting the demon live inside him. After the Tribunal sealed him away, his heralds, the Foot Mystics, have been trying to resurrect him and after they succeed, he proceeds to conquer the world and rebuild it in his own image.
 Sean Schemmel as
 The Metal Mystic: a herald of the Shredder associated with the element of metal.
 The Earth Mystic: a herald of the Shredder associated with the element of Earth.
 The Fire Mystic: a herald of the Shredder associated with the element of Fire.
 Brian Maillard as
 The Water Mystic: a herald of the Shredder associated with the element of water.
 The Wind Mystic: a herald of the Shredder associated with the element of Wind.

Recuuring
 David Zen Mansley as
 Hun: the leader of the Purple Dragon who along with his gang reluctantly join forces with the turtles against the Tengu Shredder.
 John Bishop: the leader of the Earth Protection Force devoted to the protection of earth against extraterrestrial races who also joins the turtles against the Tengu Shredder.
 Scott Williams as Dr. Baxter Stockman: a scientist working for the E.P.F who was formerly working for the Foot.
 Sam Riegel as Dr. Chaplin: a young scientist working for the Foot who has feelings for Karai.

Crew
Teenage Mutant Ninja Turtles was produced by Mirage Studios, 4 Kids Entertainment, 4Kids Productions, and Dong Woo Animation and distributed by 4 Kids Entertainment and was aired on Fox's Saturday morning kids' block in the US. The producers were Gary Richardson, Frederick U. Fierst, and Joellyn Marlow for the American team; Tae Ho Han was the producer for the Korean team.

Reception
The fifth season was met with universal acclaim and was considered the best season. As of June 2008, it had 1.45 million views and has a rank of 97%.

Episodes

References

External links

Season Five Episode list with detailed synopses at the Official Ninja Turtles website

2006 American television seasons
Season 5
Television shows set in Japan